DWRG (105.5 FM), broadcasting as 105.5 Idol FM, is a radio station owned and operated by Apollo Broadcast Investors. Its studios are located at the 5th floor, S.T. Bldg., Naga College Foundation Compound, Brgy. Peñafrancia, Naga, Camarines Sur.

References

Radio stations in Naga, Camarines Sur
Radio stations established in 2018